Lodewijk Meyer (also Meijer) (bapt. 18 October 1629, Amsterdam – buried 25 November 1681, Amsterdam) was a Dutch physician, classical scholar, translator, lexicographer, and playwright. He was a radical intellectual and one of the more prominent members of the circle around the philosopher Benedictus de Spinoza.

He is generally considered the author of an anonymous work, the Philosophia S. Scripturae Interpres, although there are indications that his friend Johannes Bouwmeester may have been the co-author or even the author. It was initially attributed to Spinoza, and caused a furor among preachers and theologians, with its claims that the Bible was in many places opaque and ambiguous; and that philosophy was the only criterion for interpretation of cruxes in such passages. Just after the death of Meyer his friends revealed that he was the author of the work, which had been banned by the Court of Holland together with Spinoza's Tractatus Theologico-Politicus in 1674.

Works
Including:
 1660: 
 translated: The Principles of Cartesian Philosophy and Metaphysical Thoughts by Baruch Spinoza contains Meyer's Preface and also his Inaugural Dissertation on Matter (1660). It is translated by Samuel Shirley and published by Hackett Publishing Company, Inc., Indianapolis/Cambridge, 1998, .
(in Latin) [[:File:Lodewijk Meyer - De materia, ejusque affectionibus motu, et quiete - University dissertation in Latin - Leiden, 1660.pdf|De materia, ejusque affectionibus motu, et quiete": Meyer's 1660 Latin dissertation at Leiden University]]
 1664 with Benedictus de Spinoza and Pieter Balling (in Dutch): Renatus Des Cartes Beginzelen der wysbegeerte, I en II deel, na de meetkonstige wijze beweezen door Benedictus de Spinoza ... : mitsgaders des zelfs overnatuurkundige gedachten, in welke de zwaarste geschillen ..., kortelijk werden verklaart, Amsterdam: Jan Rieuwertsz. boekverk. in de Dirk van Assensteegh, in 't Martelaars-boek, 1664. (With Meyer's Preface.)
 1666: 
 with Benedictus de Spinoza (in Latin): Philosophia S. Scripturæ interpres : exercitatio paradoxa, in quâ, veram philosophiam infallibilem S. Literas interpretandi normam esse, apodicticè demonstratur, & discrepantes ab hâc sententiæ expenduntur, ac refelluntur ..., Eleutheropoli [= (Grieks) "Freetown"]: unknown publisher, 1666.
 translated:  translation of Philosophia S. Scripturae Interpres 1668 (in Dutch): L. Meijers Ghulde vlies : treurspel, Amsterdam: Jacob Lescailje, 1668
 1669 (in Dutch): L. Meijers woordenschat, : in drie deelen ghescheiden, van welke het I. bastaardtwoorden, II. konstwoorden, III. verouderde woorden beghrijpt., Amsterdam:  weduwe van Jan Hendriksz. Boom, 1669
 1688 (in Dutch): L. Meijers woordenschat : verdeelt in 1. Bastaardt-woorden. 2. Konst-woorden. 3. Verouderde woorden., Amsterdam: Jeronimus Ratelband, 1688?, 1745
 1677, translation by Meyer of Antoine Le Métel d'Ouville (in Dutch): Het spookend weeuwtje, blyspél, Amsterdam: Albert Magnus, 1677
 1678, translation by Meyer of Jean Racine (in Dutch): Andromaché. Treurspel.'', Amsterdam: Izaak Duim, bezuiden het Stadhuis, 1678(?), 1744.

References

Sources

1629 births
1681 deaths
17th-century Dutch dramatists and playwrights
Dutch lexicographers
17th-century Dutch physicians
Dutch translators
Writers from Amsterdam
People associated with Baruch Spinoza
Dutch male dramatists and playwrights